Douglas Walker (born 28 July 1973 in Inverness), also known as Doug or Dougie Walker, is a former Scottish sprinter. He represented Scotland at the Commonwealth Games in 1994 and 1998. He was a relay medallist at the 1997 World Championships in Athletics and at the 1998 European Athletics Championships he claimed a 200 metres/relay gold medal double.

Educated at George Heriot's School in Edinburgh, in 1998 he became European champion in both 200 metres and 4x100 metres relay. With 31.56 seconds he is the European record holder in 300 metres, although this distance is rarely run.

He tested positive for the anabolic steroid nandrolone in 1998 but was cleared of all charges by a UK Athletics disciplinary committee in 1999. IAAF later overturned that decision, applying their strict liability rule and he received a two-year ban in 2000. Despite an attempted comeback following his suspension, the ban effectively ended his elite level athletics career.

International competitions

References

External links

1973 births
Living people
Sportspeople from Inverness
Scottish male sprinters
Commonwealth Games competitors for Scotland
Athletes (track and field) at the 1994 Commonwealth Games
Athletes (track and field) at the 1998 Commonwealth Games
World Athletics Championships athletes for Great Britain
World Athletics Championships medalists
European Athletics Championships medalists
Scottish sportspeople in doping cases
Doping cases in athletics
People educated at George Heriot's School
Universiade medalists in athletics (track and field)
Universiade silver medalists for Great Britain
Medalists at the 1995 Summer Universiade
Medalists at the 1997 Summer Universiade